Falkenbergs Bordtennisklubb (Falkenberg Table Tennis Club) is a Swedish table tennis club formed on November 30, 1925.

The club played its first season in the top league (Allsvenskan)  in  1951 and has over the years won ten national Swedish team championships (1963, 1964, 1971, 1972, 1976, 1979, 1980, 1981, 1986 and 1988) and one European championship.

Several world class players has represented the club, including Stellan Bengtsson, Ulf "Tickan" Carlsson, Jörgen Persson and Peter Karlsson

References

External links
Official website 

1925 establishments in Sweden
Sports clubs established in 1925
Table tennis clubs in Sweden
Sport in Falkenberg
Sports clubs in Sweden